Bhāskara II (c. 1114–1185), also known as Bhāskarāchārya ("Bhāskara, the teacher"), and as Bhāskara II to avoid confusion with Bhāskara I, was an Indian mathematician and astronomer. From verses, in his main work, Siddhānta Shiromani (सिद्धांतशिरोमणी), it can be inferred that he was born in 1114 in Vijjadavida (Vijjalavida) and living in the Sahyadri mountain ranges of Western Ghats, believed to be the town of Patan in Chalisgaon, located in present-day Khandesh region of Maharashtra by scholars. He is the only ancient mathematician who has been immortalized on a monument. In a temple in Maharashtra, an inscription supposedly created by his grandson Changadeva, lists Bhaskaracharya's ancestral lineage for several generations before him as well as two generations after him. Colebrooke who was the first European to translate (1817) Bhaskaracharya II's  mathematical classics refers to the family as Maharashtrian Brahmins residing on the banks of the Godavari.

Born in a Hindu Deshastha Brahmin family of scholars, mathematicians and astronomers, Bhaskara II was the leader of a cosmic observatory at Ujjain, the main mathematical centre of ancient India. Bhāskara and his works represent a significant contribution to mathematical and astronomical knowledge in the 12th century. He has been called the greatest mathematician of medieval India. His main work Siddhānta-Śiromaṇi, (Sanskrit for "Crown of Treatises") is divided into four parts called Līlāvatī, Bījagaṇita, Grahagaṇita and Golādhyāya, which are also sometimes considered four independent works. These four sections deal with arithmetic, algebra, mathematics of the planets, and spheres respectively. He also wrote another treatise named Karaṇā Kautūhala.

Date, place and family
Bhāskara gives his date of birth, and date of composition of his major work, in a verse in the Āryā metre:

This reveals that he was born in 1036 of the Shaka era (1114 CE), and that he composed the Siddhānta Shiromani when he was 36 years old. Siddhānta Shiromani was completed during 1150 CE. He also wrote another work called the Karaṇa-kutūhala when he was 69 (in 1183). His works show the influence of Brahmagupta, Śrīdhara, Mahāvīra, Padmanābha and other predecessors. Bhaskara lived in Patnadevi located near Patan (Chalisgaon) in the vicinity of Sahyadri.

He was born in a Deśastha Rigvedi Brahmin family near Vijjadavida (Vijjalavida). 
Munishvara (17th century), a commentator on Siddhānta Shiromani of Bhaskara has given the information about the location of Vijjadavida in his work Marīci Tīkā as follows:  

This description  locates Vijjalavida in Maharashtra, near the Vidarbha region and close to the banks of Godavari river. However scholars differ about the exact location. Many scholars have placed the place near Patan in (Chalisgaon Taluka of Jalgaon district) whereas a section of scholars identified it with the modern day Beed city. Some  sources  identified Vijjalavida as Bijapur or Bidar in Karnataka. Identification of Vijjalavida with Basar in Telangana has also been suggested.

Bhāskara is said to have been the head of an astronomical observatory at Ujjain, the leading mathematical centre of medieval India. History records his great-great-great-grandfather holding a hereditary post as a court scholar, as did his son and other descendants. His father Maheśvara (Maheśvaropādhyāya)  was a mathematician, astronomer and astrologer, who taught him mathematics, which he later passed on to his son Lokasamudra. Lokasamudra's son helped to set up a school in 1207 for the study of Bhāskara's writings. He died in 1185 CE.

The Siddhānta-Śiromaṇi

Līlāvatī
The first section Līlāvatī (also known as pāṭīgaṇita or aṅkagaṇita), named after his daughter, consists of 277 verses. It covers calculations, progressions, measurement, permutations, and other topics.

Bijaganita
The second section Bījagaṇita(Algebra) has 213 verses. It discusses zero, infinity, positive and negative numbers, and indeterminate equations including (the now called) Pell's equation, solving it using a kuṭṭaka method. In particular, he also solved the  case that was to elude Fermat and his European contemporaries centuries later.

Grahaganita
In the third section Grahagaṇita, while treating the motion of planets, he considered their instantaneous speeds. He arrived at the approximation: It consists of 451 verses

  for. 
 .
In his words:

This result had also been observed earlier by Muñjalācārya (or Mañjulācārya) mānasam, in the context of a table of sines.

Bhāskara also stated that at its highest point a planet's instantaneous speed is zero.

Mathematics
Some of Bhaskara's contributions to mathematics include the following:

 A proof of the Pythagorean theorem by calculating the same area in two different ways and then cancelling out terms to get a2 + b2 = c2.
 In Lilavati, solutions of quadratic, cubic and quartic indeterminate equations are explained.
 Solutions of indeterminate quadratic equations (of the type ax2 + b = y2).
 Integer solutions of linear and quadratic indeterminate equations (Kuṭṭaka). The rules he gives are (in effect) the same as those given by the Renaissance European mathematicians of the 17th century.
 A cyclic Chakravala method for solving indeterminate equations of the form ax2 + bx + c = y.  The solution to this equation was traditionally attributed to William Brouncker in 1657, though his method was more difficult than the chakravala method.
 The first general method for finding the solutions of the problem x2 − ny2 = 1 (so-called "Pell's equation") was given by Bhaskara II.
 Solutions of Diophantine equations of the second order, such as 61x2 + 1 = y2. This very equation was posed as a problem in 1657 by the French mathematician Pierre de Fermat, but its solution was unknown in Europe until the time of Euler in the 18th century.
 Solved quadratic equations with more than one unknown, and found negative and irrational solutions.
 Preliminary concept of mathematical analysis.
 Preliminary concept of infinitesimal calculus, along with notable contributions towards integral calculus.
 Conceived differential calculus, after discovering an approximation of the derivative and differential coefficient.
 Stated Rolle's theorem, a special case of one of the most important theorems in analysis, the mean value theorem. Traces of the general mean value theorem are also found in his works.
 Calculated the derivatives of trigonometric functions and formulae. (See Calculus section below.)
 In Siddhanta-Śiromaṇi, Bhaskara developed spherical trigonometry along with a number of other trigonometric results. (See Trigonometry section below.)

Arithmetic 
Bhaskara's arithmetic text Līlāvatī covers the topics of definitions, arithmetical terms, interest computation, arithmetical and geometrical progressions, plane geometry, solid geometry, the shadow of the gnomon, methods to solve indeterminate equations, and combinations.

Līlāvatī is divided into 13 chapters and covers many branches of mathematics, arithmetic, algebra, geometry, and a little trigonometry and measurement. More specifically the contents include:

 Definitions.
 Properties of zero (including division, and rules of operations with zero).
 Further extensive numerical work, including use of negative numbers and surds.
 Estimation of π.
 Arithmetical terms, methods of multiplication, and squaring.
 Inverse rule of three, and rules of 3, 5, 7, 9, and 11.
 Problems involving interest and interest computation.
 Indeterminate equations (Kuṭṭaka), integer solutions (first and second order). His contributions to this topic are particularly important, since the rules he gives are (in effect) the same as those given by the renaissance European mathematicians of the 17th century, yet his work was of the 12th century. Bhaskara's method of solving was an improvement of the methods found in the work of Aryabhata and subsequent mathematicians.

His work is outstanding for its systematisation, improved methods and the new topics that he introduced. Furthermore, the Lilavati contained excellent problems and it is thought that Bhaskara's intention may have been that a student of 'Lilavati' should concern himself with the mechanical application of the method.

Algebra
His Bījaganita ("Algebra") was a work in twelve chapters. It was the first text to recognize that a positive number has two square roots (a positive and negative square root). His work Bījaganita is effectively a treatise on algebra and contains the following topics:

 Positive and negative numbers.
 The 'unknown' (includes determining unknown quantities).
 Determining unknown quantities.
 Surds (includes evaluating surds).
 Kuṭṭaka (for solving indeterminate equations and Diophantine equations).
 Simple equations (indeterminate of second, third and fourth degree).
 Simple equations with more than one unknown.
 Indeterminate quadratic equations (of the type ax2 + b = y2).
 Solutions of indeterminate equations of the second, third and fourth degree.
 Quadratic equations.
 Quadratic equations with more than one unknown.
 Operations with products of several unknowns.

Bhaskara derived a cyclic, chakravala method for solving indeterminate quadratic equations of the form ax2 + bx + c = y. Bhaskara's method for finding the solutions of the problem Nx2 + 1 = y2 (the so-called "Pell's equation") is of considerable importance.

Trigonometry

The Siddhānta Shiromani (written in 1150) demonstrates Bhaskara's knowledge of trigonometry, including the sine table and relationships between different trigonometric functions. He also developed spherical trigonometry, along with other interesting trigonometrical results. In particular Bhaskara seemed more interested in trigonometry for its own sake than his predecessors who saw it only as a tool for calculation.

Calculus
His work, the Siddhānta Shiromani, is an astronomical treatise and contains many theories not found in earlier works. Preliminary concepts of infinitesimal calculus and mathematical analysis, along with a number of results in trigonometry, differential calculus and integral calculus that are found in the work are of particular interest.

Evidence suggests Bhaskara was acquainted with some ideas of differential calculus.  Bhaskara also goes deeper into the 'differential calculus' and suggests the differential coefficient vanishes at an extremum value of the function, indicating knowledge of the concept of 'infinitesimals'.

 There is evidence of an early form of Rolle's theorem in his work.
 He gave the result that if  then , thereby finding the derivative of sine, although he never developed the notion of derivatives.
 Bhaskara uses this result to work out the position angle of the ecliptic, a quantity required for accurately predicting the time of an eclipse.
 He was aware that when a variable attains the maximum value, its differential vanishes.
 He also showed that when a planet is at its farthest from the earth, or at its closest, the equation of the centre (measure of how far a planet is from the position in which it is predicted to be, by assuming it is to move uniformly) vanishes. He therefore concluded that for some intermediate position the differential of the equation of the centre is equal to zero. In this result, there are traces of the general mean value theorem, one of the most important theorems in analysis, which today is usually derived from Rolle's theorem. The mean value theorem was later found by Parameshvara in the 15th century in the Lilavati Bhasya, a commentary on Bhaskara's Lilavati.

Madhava (1340–1425) and the Kerala School mathematicians (including Parameshvara) from the 14th century to the 16th century expanded on Bhaskara's work and further advanced the development of calculus in India.

Astronomy
Using an astronomical model developed by Brahmagupta in the 7th century, Bhāskara accurately defined many astronomical quantities, including, for example, the length of the sidereal year, the time that is required for the Earth to orbit the Sun, as approximately 365.2588 days which is the same as in Suryasiddhanta.  The modern accepted measurement is 365.25636 days, a difference of 3.5 minutes.

His mathematical astronomy text Siddhanta Shiromani is written in two parts: the first part on mathematical astronomy and the second part on the sphere.

The twelve chapters of the first part cover topics such as:

 Mean longitudes of the planets.
 True longitudes of the planets.
 The three problems of diurnal rotation.(Diurnal motion is an astronomical term referring to the apparent daily motion of stars around the Earth, or more precisely around the two celestial poles. It is caused by the Earth's rotation on its axis, so every star apparently moves on a circle, that is called the diurnal circle.)
 Syzygies.
 Lunar eclipses.
 Solar eclipses.
 Latitudes of the planets.
 Sunrise equation
 The Moon's crescent.
 Conjunctions of the planets with each other.
 Conjunctions of the planets with the fixed stars.
 The paths of the Sun and Moon.

The second part contains thirteen chapters on the sphere. It covers topics such as:

Praise of study of the sphere.
Nature of the sphere.
Cosmography and geography.
Planetary mean motion.
Eccentric epicyclic model of the planets.
The armillary sphere.
Spherical trigonometry.
Ellipse calculations.
First visibilities of the planets.
Calculating the lunar crescent.
Astronomical instruments.
The seasons.
Problems of astronomical calculations.

Engineering
The earliest reference to a perpetual motion machine date back to 1150, when Bhāskara II described a wheel that he claimed would run forever.

Bhāskara II used a measuring device known as Yaṣṭi-yantra. This device could vary from a simple stick to V-shaped staffs designed specifically for determining angles with the help of a calibrated scale.

Legends
In his book Lilavati, he reasons: "In this quantity also which has zero as its divisor there is no change even when many quantities have entered into it or come out [of it], just as at the time of destruction and creation when throngs of creatures enter into and come out of [him, there is no change in] the infinite and unchanging [Vishnu]".

"Behold!"
It has been stated, by several authors, that Bhaskara II proved the Pythagorean theorem by drawing a diagram and providing the single word "Behold!". Sometimes Bhaskara's name is omitted and this is referred to as the Hindu proof, well known by schoolchildren.

However, as mathematics historian Kim Plofker points out, after presenting a worked out example, Bhaskara II states the Pythagorean theorem:

This is followed by:

Plofker suggests that this additional statement may be the ultimate source of the widespread "Behold!" legend.

Legacy
A number of institutes and colleges in India are named after him, including Bhaskaracharya Pratishthana in Pune, Bhaskaracharya College of Applied Sciences in Delhi, Bhaskaracharya Institute For Space Applications and Geo-Informatics in Gandhinagar.

On 20 November 1981 the Indian Space Research Organisation (ISRO)  launched the Bhaskara II satellite honouring the mathematician and astronomer.

Invis Multimedia released Bhaskaracharya, an Indian documentary short on the mathematician in 2015.

See also
 List of Indian mathematicians

References

Bibliography

Further reading

 W. W. Rouse Ball. A Short Account of the History of Mathematics, 4th Edition. Dover Publications, 1960.
 George Gheverghese Joseph. The Crest of the Peacock: Non-European Roots of Mathematics, 2nd Edition. Penguin Books, 2000.
  University of St Andrews, 2000.
 Ian Pearce. Bhaskaracharya II at the MacTutor archive. St Andrews University, 2002.

External links

 4to40 Biography

12th-century Indian mathematicians
12th-century Indian astronomers
People from Jalgaon
1110s births
1185 deaths
Algebraists
Scientists from Maharashtra
Scholars from Maharashtra
Acharyas
Sanskrit writers